José Gutiérrez de la Concha e Irigoyen, 1st Marquess of Havana, 1st Viscount of Cuba, Grandee of Spain (Córdoba, Viceroyalty of the Río de la Plata, 4 June 1809 – Madrid, Spain, 5 November 1895) was a Spanish noble, general, and politician who served three times as Captain General of Cuba and once as the Prime Minister of Spain.

He was born in Córdoba, then part of the Viceroyalty of River Plate in the Spanish Empire.

In 1851, while in command in Cuba, he defeated the Lopez Expedition, a filibustering attempt to seize the island.

1809 births
1895 deaths
19th-century Spanish politicians
Governors of Cuba
Cuban nobility
Prime Ministers of Spain
Grandees of Spain
Marquesses of Spain
Military personnel of the First Carlist War
Moderate Party (Spain) politicians
People from Córdoba, Argentina
Spanish captain generals
Presidents of the Senate of Spain